Kathryn Ann Wallace (born June 9, 1975) is an American television and film journalist best known for her work as the coordinating producer on the National Geographic television series Lockdown and as a producer on the National Geographic documentary Inside Guantanamo. Kathryn has also been published extensively by several major magazines including Reader's Digest.

Personal life
Kathryn was born in Newport News, Virginia, to Larry and Ann Wallace. She grew up in Yorktown, Virginia, with three siblings: Emily, Ellen, and Rob. She attended Tabb High School in Yorktown, Virginia. She then attended Brigham Young University in Provo, Utah, where she received a B.A. in Humanities. Later she attended Stanford University and received a master's degree in film journalism.

Television

Discovery Channel
 Gold Rush, Gold Rush TV series, field producer Talk Show episode, 2012
 Who the Bleep Did I Marry?
 Evil Twins
 Curiosity series

PBS
 Rise of the Drones NOVA NOVA TV series

ABC
 Breaking Polygamy 20/20 Airdate: January 26, 2013

Hooking Up
In a hard-hitting investigation, ABC News takes on the gritty, unpredictable world of online dating in the 5-hour series, Hooking Up. Outdated profile pictures, inflated salaries, bogus hobbies—ABC exposes the fraud and the hurt feelings, the beauties and beasts. Airdate: summer 2005.

National Geographic

Lockdown
Lockdown is an in-depth look at the US prison system from the prisoner's viewpoint. Episodes focus on gangs, initiations, prison violence, rehabilitation and release. Kathy was the Coordinating Producer for the following episodes:
 Alaskan Justice
 Chaos Control
 County Jail
 Female Felons
 First Timers
 Gangland
 Gang vs. Family
 Gang War
 Inmate U

Inside Guantanamo
Kathryn was a producer for the National Geographic documentary entitled Inside Guantanamo, first broadcast in early April 2009. The film interviewed some key players who played a role in the controversial camp.
Colonel Bruce Vargo called the camps: "an integral part of the war on terror."
Lieutenant Commander Charles Swift, the Navy lawyer assigned to defend Salim Ahmed Hamdan, said:
"Guantanamo Bay was the legal equivalent of outer space -- a place with no law."

Neil Genzlinger, reporting for New York Times, wrote:

Print

Investigative Reporting 
Kathryn is the author of the following articles:
 Ron Paul Staying Busy After Helping to Change Dialogue
 Using the Science of Fear to Make Soldiers Stronger 
 America's Brain Drain Crisis
 another link 
 Sniper on the Loose
 A Plateful of Trouble
 Home Cheat Home

References

External links
 Inside Guantanamo - National Geographic
 Lockdown - National Geographic
 Prison Misery, for Detainees and Guards - New York Times
 Iraqi Subcontractor List Includes Dubious Companies
 A Soldier's Conscience Falters
 Sniper on the Loose - Reader's Digest
 A Plateful of Trouble - Reader's Digest
 America's Brain Drain Crisis - Reader's Digest
 When is gossip news?
 Osama in the House?
 

1975 births
Living people
People from Yorktown, Virginia
Tabb High School alumni